Johnny "Playboy" Prescott (20 August 1938 — 11 November 2012) born in Birmingham was an English professional cruiser/heavyweight boxer of the 1960s and 1970s, who won the British Boxing Board of Control (BBBofC) Midlands Area heavyweight title, and was a challenger for the BBBofC British heavyweight title, and British Commonwealth heavyweight title against Henry Cooper, the outdoor bout at Birmingham City's St Andrew's stadium was postponed for a day because of bad weather, his professional fighting weight varied from , i.e. cruiserweight to , i.e. heavyweight, he died in Good Hope Hospital, Sutton Coldfield. Johnny Prescott was an orphan, and was resident at Josiah Mason's Orphanage, Orphanage Road, Erdington, he later lived with his grandmother on William Henry Street, Nechells, he was a fan of Birmingham City, i.e. a Bluenose, as a boxer he was managed by George Biddles.

References

External links

Image - Johnny Prescott
Article - 'Playboy' Brummie boxer Johnny Prescott dies at 74

1938 births
2012 deaths
Cruiserweight boxers
English male boxers
Heavyweight boxers
Boxers from Birmingham, West Midlands